Deities depicted with horns or antlers are found in many religions across the world. In religions that venerate animal deities, horned bulls, goats, and rams may be worshiped as deities or serve as the inspiration for a deity's appearance. Many pagan religions include horned gods in their pantheons, such as Pan in Greek mythology and Ikenga in Odinala. Some neopagan religions have constructed these deities as the Horned God, representing the male part of their duotheistic theological system. 

In Abrahamic religions, horned deities are closely associated with demonology. Christian demons are described as having horns in the Book of Revelation, and other demons such as Satan, Baphomet, and Beelzebub are typically portrayed with horns.

Horned goddess Hathor

Hathor is commonly depicted as a cow goddess with head horns in which is set a sun disk with Uraeus. Twin feathers are also sometimes shown in later periods as well as a  necklace. Hathor may be the cow goddess who is depicted from an early date on the Narmer Palette and on a stone urn dating from the 1st dynasty that suggests a role as sky-goddess and a relationship to Horus who, as a sun god, is "housed" in her.

Hathor had a complex relationship with Ra, in one myth she is his eye and considered his daughter but later, when Ra assumes the role of Horus with respect to Kingship, she is considered Ra's mother. She absorbed this role from another cow goddess 'Mht wrt' ("Great flood") who was the mother of Ra in a creation myth and carried him between her horns. As a mother she gave birth to Ra each morning on the eastern horizon and as wife she conceives through union with him each day.

Bat was a cow goddess in Egyptian mythology depicted as a human face with cow ears and horns. By the time of the Middle Kingdom her identity and attributes were subsumed within the goddess Hathor. The worship of Bat dates to earliest times and may have its origins in Late Paleolithic cattle herding. Bat was the chief goddess of Seshesh, otherwise known as Hu or Diospolis Parva, the 7th nome of Upper Egypt.
The imagery of Bat as a divine cow was remarkably similar to that of Hathor the parallel goddess from Lower Egypt. The significant difference in their depiction is that Bat's horns curve inward and Hathor's curve outward slightly. It is possible that this could be based in the different breeds of cattle herded at different times.

Cult of the bull deities

In Egypt, the bull was worshiped as Apis, the embodiment of Ptah and later of Osiris. A long series of ritually perfect bulls were identified by the god's priests, housed in the temple for their lifetime, then embalmed and encased in a giant sarcophagus. A long sequence of monolithic stone sarcophagi were housed in the Serapeum of Saqqara, and were rediscovered by Auguste Mariette at Saqqara in 1851. The bull was also worshipped as Mnevis, the embodiment of Atum-Ra, in Heliopolis.  Ka in Egyptian is both a religious concept of life-force/power and the word for bull.

Mnevis was identified as being a living bull. This may be a vestige of the sacrifice of kings after a period of reign, who were seen as the sons of Bat or Hathor (see:horned goddess Hathor), the ancient cow deity of the early solar cults. Thus, seen as a symbol of the later sun god, Ra, the Mnevis was often depicted, in art, with the solar disc of their mother, Hathor between its horns.

The Canaanite deity Moloch (according to the bible) was often depicted as a bull, and became a bull demon in Abrahamic traditions. The bull is familiar in Judeo-Christian cultures from the Biblical episode wherein an idol of the Golden Calf is made by Aaron and worshipped by the Hebrews in the wilderness of the Sinai Peninsula (Exodus).  The text of the Hebrew Bible can be understood to refer to the idol as representing a separate god, or as representing the God of Israel himself, perhaps through an association or syncretization with Egyptian or Levantine bull gods, rather than a new deity in itself.

Exodus 32:4 "He took this from their hand, and fashioned it with a graving tool and made it into a molten calf; and they said, 'This is your god, O Israel, who brought you up from the land of Egypt'."

Nehemiah 9:18 "even when they made an idol shaped like a calf and said, 'This is your god who brought you out of Egypt!' They committed terrible blasphemies."

Calf-idols are referred to later in the Tanakh, such as in the Book of Hosea, which would seem accurate as they were a fixture of near-eastern cultures.

King Solomon's "bronze sea"-basin stood on twelve brazen bulls, according to 1. Kings 7:25.

Young bulls were set as frontier markers at Tel Dan and at Bethel the frontiers of the Kingdom of Israel.

Ram deities in ancient Egypt

The ram was revered in ancient Egypt in matters of fertility and war. Early gods with long wavy ram horns include Khnum and the equivalent god in Lower Egypt, Banebdjedet, the "Ram Lord of Djedet" (Mendes), who was typically shown with four ram heads to represent the four souls (Ba) of the sun god. Banebdjedet may also be linked to the first four gods to rule over Egypt, Osiris, Geb, Shu and Ra-Atum, with large granite shrines devoted to each in the Mendes sanctuary. The Book of the Heavenly Cow describes the "Ram of Mendes" as being the Ba of Osiris, but this was not an exclusive association.

List of Egyptian gods associated with the ram:
 Khnum (one of the earliest Egyptian deities)
 Heryshaf (a ram god of Heracleopolis)
 Kherty (a variant of Aken, The chief deity in Egyptian mythology)
 Andjety (precursor of Osiris, Auf "Efu Ra").
 Horem Akhet (a god depicted as a sphinx with the head of a man, lion, or ram)
 Banebdjedet (ram god linked to the first four Egyptian gods: Osiris, Geb, Shu, Ra-Atum)
 Amun (the ram deity that inspired the cult of Ammon)

Cult of Ammon

The worship of Ammon was introduced into Greece at an early period, probably through the medium of the Greek colony in Cyrene, which must have formed a connection with the great oracle of Ammon in the Oasis soon after its establishment. Ammon had a temple and a statue, the gift of Pindar, at Thebes, and another at Sparta, the inhabitants of which, as Pausanias says, consulted the oracle of Ammon in Libya from early times more than the other Greeks. At Aphytis, Chalcidice, Ammon was worshipped, from the time of Lysander, as zealously as in Ammonium. Pindar the poet honoured the god with a hymn. At Megalopolis the god was represented with the head of a ram (Paus. viii.32 § 1), and the Greeks of Cyrenaica dedicated at Delphi a chariot with a statue of Ammon.

Such was its reputation among the Classical Greeks that Alexander the Great journeyed there after the battle of Issus and during his occupation of Egypt, where he was declared the son of Amun by the oracle.  Alexander thereafter considered himself divine.  Even during this occupation, Amun, identified by these Greeks as a form of Zeus, continued to be the principal local deity of Thebes.

The Cyrenaican Greeks built temples for the Libyan god Amon instead of their original god Zeus. They later identified their supreme god Zeus with the Libyan Amon. Some of them continued worshipping Amon himself.
Amon's cult was so widespread among the Greeks that even Alexander the Great decided to be declared as the son of Zeus in the Siwan temple by the Libyan priests of Amon.

Although the most modern sources ignored the existence of Amun in the Berber mythology, he was maybe the greatest ancient Berber god. He was honored by the Ancient Greeks in Cyrenaica, and was united with the Phoenician/Carthaginian god Baal-hamon due to Libyan influence. Some depictions of the ram across North Africa belong to the lithic period which is situated between 9600 BC and 7500 BC. 
The most famous Amun's temple in Ancient Libya was the temple at the oasis of Siwa.
The name of the ancient Berber tribes: Garamantes and Nasamonians are believed by some scholars to be related to the name Amon.

In Awelimmiden Tuareg, the name Amanai is believed to have the meaning of "God". The Ancient Libyans may have worshipped the setting sun, which was personified by Amon, who was represented by the ram's horns.

In Carthage and North Africa Baal-hamon was especially associated with the ram and was worshiped also as Baʿal Qarnaim ("Lord of Two Horns") in an open-air sanctuary at Jebel Bu Kornein ("the two-horned hill") across the bay from Carthage.

The Egyptian god Ammon-Ra was depicted with ram horns. Rams were considered a symbol of virility due to their rutting behavior. The Horns of Ammon may have also represented the East and West of the Earth, and one of the titles of Ammon was "the two-horned." Alexander was depicted with the horns of Ammon as a result of his conquest of ancient Egypt in 332 BC, where the priesthood received him as the son of the god Ammon, who was identified by the ancient Greeks with Zeus, the King of the Gods. The combined deity Zeus-Ammon was a distinct figure in ancient Greek mythology. According to five historians of antiquity (Arrian, Curtius, Diodorus, Justin, and Plutarch), Alexander visited the Oracle of Ammon at Siwa in the Libyan desert and rumors spread that the Oracle had revealed Alexander's father to be the deity Ammon, rather than Philip. Alexander styled himself as the son of Zeus-Ammon and even demanded to be worshiped as a god:

He seems to have become convinced of the reality of his own divinity and to have required its acceptance by others ... The cities perforce complied, but often ironically: the Spartan decree read,  'Since Alexander wishes to be a god, let him be a god.'

By continent

Europe

Pan was a Greek god of shepherds and flocks, of mountain wilds and rustic music. The moon goddess, Selene, was also commonly described as "horned", that is the crescent moon upon her head or shoulders.

Depictions in Celtic cultures of figures with antlers are often identified as Cernunnos ("horned one" in Latin). The prime evidence for this comes from a pillar in Paris which also features the Roman god Jupiter.

Cocidius was the name of a Romano-British war-god and local deity from the region around Hadrian's Wall, who is sometimes represented as being horned. He is associated with warfare and woodland and was worshipped mostly by military personnel and the lower classes.

Eliphas Levi, the 18th century French occultist, believed that the pseudohistorical god Baphomet (that the Roman Catholic Church had claimed was worshipped by the heretical Knights Templar), was actually the horned Libyan oracle god (Ammon), or, the Goat of Mendes.

For many years scholars have interpreted the Gundestrup Cauldron's images in terms of the Celtic pantheon. The antlered figure in plate A has been commonly identified as Cernunnos.

Africa

A ram-shaped oracle god whose name is unknown (Baal Hamon – Phoenician / Carthaginian ) was worshiped by Libyan tribes at Siwa. The figure was incorporated by the Egyptians into depictions of their god Amun that's considered an "Interpretatio graeca" of the Greek Zeus-Ammon.

Adherents of Odinani (the traditional folk religion of the Igbo people of south-eastern Nigeria) worship the Ikenga, a horned god of honest achievement, whose two horns symbolise self-will. Small wooden statues of him are made and praised as personal altars.

Asia
The Pashupati seal, a seal discovered during the excavation of Mohenjo-daro in Pakistan has drawn attention as a possible representation of a "proto-Shiva" figure. This "Pashupati" (Lord of animal-like beings – Sanskrit ) seal shows a seated figure with horns, possibly ithyphallic, surrounded by animals.

Several Indus Valley seals show a fighting scene between a tiger-like beast and a man with horns, hooves and a tail, who has been compared to the Mesopotamian bull-man Enkidu, also a partner of Gilgamesh, and suggests a transmission of Mesopotamian mythology (see Indus-Mesopotamia relations).

Americas
The Horned Serpent appears in the mythologies of many Native Americans.  Details vary among tribes, with many of the stories associating the mystical figure with water, rain, lightning and thunder.  Horned Serpents were major components of the Southeastern Ceremonial Complex of North American prehistory.

Horns mentioned in the bible
The Canaanite gods Baal and El were likely originally horned bull gods.

Psalm 75:10
"I will cut off the horns of all the wicked, but the horns of the righteous will be lifted up."
Deuteronomy 33:17
In majesty he (Jacob) is like a firstborn bull; his horns are the horns of a wild ox. With them he will gore the nations, even those at the ends of the earth.
Revelation 13:11
Then I saw a second beast, coming out of the earth. It had two horns like a lamb, but it spoke like a dragon.
Leviticus 4:7
The priest shall then put some of the blood on the horns of the (Yahweh's) altar of fragrant incense that is before the LORD in the tent of meeting. The rest of the bull's blood he shall pour out at the base of the altar of burnt offering at the entrance to the tent of meeting.

Exodus
The depiction of a horned Moses stems from the description of Moses' face as "cornuta" ("horned") in the Latin Vulgate translation of the passage from Exodus in which Moses returns to the people after receiving the Ten Commandments for the second time. The Douay–Rheims Bible translates the Vulgate as, "And when Moses came down from the mount Sinai, he held the two tables of the testimony, and he knew not that his face was horned from the conversation of the Lord."

Influence on demonology

Christian demonology

The idea that demons have horns seems to have been taken from the Book of Revelation chapter 13. The book of Revelation seems to have inspired many depictions of demons. This idea has also been associated with the depiction of certain ancient gods like Moloch and the shedu, etc., which were portrayed as bulls, as men with the head of a bull, or wearing bull horns as a crown.

Baphomet of Mendes
The satanic "horned god" symbol known as the baphomet is based on an Egyptian ram deity that was worshipped in Mendes, called Banebdjed (literally Ba of the lord of djed, and titled "the Lord of Mendes"), who was the soul of Osiris. According to Egyptian Mythology: A Guide to the Gods, Goddesses, and Traditions of ancient Egypt, the book's author Geraldine Harris, said the ram gods Ra-Amun (see: Cult of Ammon), and Banebdjed, were to mystically unite with the queen of Egypt to sire the heir to the throne (a theory based on depictions found in several Theban temples in Mendes).

Occultist Eliphas Levi in his Dogme et Rituel de la Haute Magie (1855), combined the images of the Tarot of Marseilles' Devil card and refigured the ram Banebdjed as a he-goat, calling it the "Baphomet of Mendes," (or, "Goat of Mendes"). The inaccurate description can be traced back to Herodotus' Histories Book II, where Herodotus describes the deity of Mendes as having a goat's head and fleece, when Banebdjedet was really represented by a ram, not a goat.

The Baphomet of Lévi was to become an important figure within the cosmology of Thelema, the mystical system established by Aleister Crowley in the early twentieth century.  Baphomet features in the Creed of the Gnostic Catholic Church recited by the congregation in The Gnostic Mass, in the sentence: "And I believe in the Serpent and the Lion, Mystery of Mystery, in His name BAPHOMET" (see: Aleister Crowley: Occult).

Lévi's Baphomet is the source of the later Tarot image of the Devil in the Rider–Waite design. The concept of a downward-pointing pentagram on its forehead was enlarged upon by Lévi in his discussion (without illustration) of the Goat of Mendes arranged within such a pentagram, which he contrasted with the microcosmic man arranged within a similar but upright pentagram. The actual image of a goat in a downward-pointing pentagram first appeared in the 1897 book La Clef de la Magie Noire by Stanislas de Guaita, later adopted as the official symbol—called the Sigil of Baphomet—of the Church of Satan, and continues to be used among Satanists.

Neopaganism

Few neopagan reconstructionist traditions recognize Satan or the Devil outright.  However, many neopagan groups worship some sort of Horned God, for example as a consort of the Great Goddess in Wicca. These gods usually reflect mythological figures such as Cernunnos or Pan, and any similarity they may have to the Christian Devil seems to date back only to the 19th century, when a Christian reaction to Pan's growing importance in literature and art resulted in his image being translated to that of the Devil.

Witch-cult hypothesis

In 1985 Classical historian Georg Luck, in his Arcana Mundi: Magic and the Occult in the Greek and Roman Worlds, theorised that the origins of the Witch-cult may have appeared in late antiquity as a faith primarily designed to worship the Horned God, stemming from the merging of Cernunnos, a horned god of the Celts, with the Greco-Roman Pan/Faunus, a combination of gods which he posits created a new deity, around which the remaining pagans, those refusing to convert to Christianity, rallied and that this deity provided the prototype for later Christian conceptions of the Devil, and his worshippers were cast by the Church as witches.

Beelzebub

There is an implied connection between Satan and Beelzebub (lit. Lord of the Flies), originally a Semitic deity called Baal (lit. "lord"). Beelzebub is the most recognized demon in the Bible, whose name has become analogous to Satan. Occult and metaphysical author Michelle Belanger believes that Beelzebub (a mockery of the original name) is the horned god Ba'al Hadad, whose cult symbol was the bull. According to The Encyclopedia of Witches, Witchcraft and Wicca, Beelzebub reigned over the Witches' Sabbath ("synagoga"), and that witches denied Christ in his name and chanted "Beelzebub" as they danced.

Beelzebub was also imagined to be sowing his influence in Salem, Massachusetts: his name came up repeatedly during the Salem witch trials, the last large-scale public expression of witch hysteria in North America or Europe, and afterwards Rev. Cotton Mather wrote a pamphlet entitled Of Beelzebub and his Plot.

Neopaganism

In 1933, the Egyptologist Margaret Murray published the book, The God of the Witches, in which she theorised that Pan was merely one form of a horned god who was worshipped across many European cultures. This theory influenced the Neopagan notion of the Horned God, as an archetype of male virility and sexuality. In Wicca, the archetype of the Horned God is highly important, and is thought by believers to be represented by such deities as the Celtic Cernunnos, Indian Pashupati and Greek Pan.

Horned God in Wiccan based neopagan religions represents a solar god often associated with vegetation, that's honoured as the Holly King or Oak King in Neopagan rituals. Most often, the Horned God is considered a male fertility god. The use of horns as a symbol for power dates back to the ancient world. From ancient Egypt and the Ba'al worshipping Cannanites, to the Greeks, Romans, Celts, and various other cultures. Horns have ever been present in religious imagery as symbols of fertility and power. It was not until Christianity attributed horns to Satan as part of his iconography that horned gods became associated with evil in Western mythology:

Many modern neo-Pagans focus their worship on a horned god, or often "the" Horned God and one or more goddesses. Deities such as Pan and Dionysus have had attributes of their worship imported into the Neopagan concept as have the Celtic Cernunnos and Gwynn ap Nudd, one of the mythological leaders of the Wild Hunt.

See also 
 Bull (mythology)
 Cattle in religion and mythology
 Cernunnos
 Deer in mythology
 Devil
 Golden calf
 Horned God
 Horned Serpent

References

External links

 
Comparative mythology
Iconography
Mythological archetypes